Maximilian Gerbl (born 25 June 1995) is a Swiss handball player for Kadetten Schaffhausen and the Swiss national team.

He represented Switzerland at the 2020 European Men's Handball Championship.

References

1995 births
Living people
Swiss male handball players
Sportspeople from Basel-Stadt